Jeremy Cameron (born 1 April 1993) is a professional footballer with the Geelong Football Club in the Australian Football League (AFL). He previously played for the Greater Western Sydney Giants from 2012 to 2020. Cameron has kicked the most goals (427) for Greater Western Sydney, and led the club's goalkicking in all nine of his seasons at the club, with his 67 goals in the 2019 home-and-away season earning him the Coleman Medal. He is also a three time All-Australian and won the Kevin Sheedy Medal in 2013. Cameron won his first premiership in 2022 with Geelong.

Early life 
Jeremy Cameron grew up in Dartmoor, a small town between Portland and Mount Gambier with a population of 150 people. Cameron began playing for the North Ballarat Rebels in TAC Cup Program in 2010, travelling over 250 km from home to Ballarat.

AFL career

Greater Western Sydney (2012–2020)

2012–2015: Early career
Jeremy Cameron was selected as a 17-year-old underage recruit by the Greater Western Sydney Giants in November 2010, a year prior to their inaugural season in the AFL. Cameron made his AFL debut on March 24, 2012, in the GWS Giants' first-ever AFL-Premiership-Season game in round 1 of the 2012 AFL Season, against Sydney. In round 2, Cameron kicked 4 goals against North Melbourne and was awarded the round 2 nomination for the 2012 AFL Rising Star, Cameron continued to show his promise when he kicked 5 goals against the Western Bulldogs in round 5, becoming the first ever GWS player to kick 5 goals in a game. Cameron finished his rookie season as the club's leading goal-kicker with 29 goals, from 16 games, averaging 1.8 goals a game.

In the 2013 AFL Season, Cameron continued to show his potential in a young GWS side, his game was already being likened to that of AFL Legends Matthew Lloyd and Jonathan Brown in only his second season. He received a Goal of the Year nomination for an excellent goal he kicked against  in Round 11, one of four he kicked for the match. In Round 18 against , Cameron kicked seven goals in the first three quarters. He finished the season by averaging 3.0 goals a game and ranked third in the Coleman Medal tally with 62 goals for the season, 6 goals behind winner, Jarryd Roughead. Cameron's excellent season resulted in him being named full-forward in the 2013 All-Australian team. He was the first Giants player to ever be named an All-Australian.

In the 2014 AFL Season, Cameron continued to show signs of being one of the most promising Centre Half Forwards in the game, for his age. He continued to show improvement, kicking his 100th AFL goal against the Western Bulldogs in round 4, one of three that he kicked during the game. Unfortunately for Cameron, injuries prevented him from replicating his previous dominate season. A perforated eardrum proved a hindrance, but repeated ankle problems were the real issue, limiting him to 14 games. He still topped the GWS goal-kicking for a third consecutive season with 29 goals on an avg of 2.1 goals a game. Cameron played his 50th AFL game against  in round 17, recording 2 goals in a 76-point loss.

In the 2015 AFL Season, Cameron returned to his previous career-best form, playing in every single game of the AFL home-and-away season. He kicked the season off by booting 4 goals in GWS's round 1 clash with St Kilda, following that up by kicking another 4 goals in a round 4 victory against the Gold Coast Suns. Cameron would then kick a mammoth 7 goals in round 6, as the Giants defeated two-time reigning premiers  by 10 points. Cameron was again, proving himself to be not only the team's most lethal forward, but one of the most lethal forwards in the competition, finishing the season as the runner-up for the Coleman Medal with 63 goals, one more than his 2013 All-Australian Season. Cameron was named in the initial 2015 40-man All-Australian Squad, but missed out on making the final team. Cameron's tag as the GIANTS' 'franchise player' was consolidated when he signed a contract extension before the 2015 season that will keep him at the club until at least the end of the 2020 season.

2016–2018: Individual success and consecutive finals appearances
Cameron received his first-ever suspension after a high hit on Brisbane player Rhys Mathieson during the 2016 NAB Challenge, resulting in Cameron being suspended for the first four games of the 2016 AFL Season. Cameron returned from suspension in round 5, recording 5 goals against St Kilda, he continued this form throughout the season, kicking four or more goals on six occasions. He would play in every remaining game of the home-and-away season following his round 5 return, finishing the season as GWS's leading goal-kicker for the 5th consecutive year with 53 goals, third place in the Coleman Medal. Cameron played a huge role in helping GWS reach their first ever final's series, finishing the season with a 16–6 win–loss record, resulting in them finishing 4th on the ladder. Cameron kicked 4 goals in the Giants first ever final, helping them defeat Sydney by 36 points in a qualifying final.

Cameron took leaps towards improving his game during the 2017 AFL Season by turning himself into a free-wheeling forward, giving himself the freedom to roam all over the ground, resulting in him increasing his disposal average from 9.5 to 15.8, his average marks a game from 4.3 to 7.1, and his average kicks a game from 7.2 to 10.9. Cameron started the season in tremendous form, recording 13 goals in the first three games, 4 in round 1 against the Adelaide Crows, 6 in round 2 against the Gold Coast Suns, and 3 in round 3 against North Melbourne. Cameron was on track to having a career-best haul when he had 39 goals after round 14, but hamstring issues cut his impact significantly. Cameron missed four of the last seven games of the regular season, resulting in him finishing the season with 45 goals. Cameron's impact again helped the Giants have a successful season, finishing 4th placed again with a win–loss record of 14-2-6. Cameron played in the first qualifying final against the Adelaide Crows, but again went down with a hamstring injury and was ruled out for the remainder of the finals series.

Cameron started the 2018 AFL Season almost identical to his previous season with 12 goals in the first three rounds, and 35 goals after round 14, but again his season was derailed, only this time it wasn't due to an injury. Cameron was suspended for five games due to a hit on Brisbane player Harris Andrews that resulted in bleeding on the brain and a severe concussion for Andrews. He returned in round 20, but only kicked 11 goals in his next six games, including only 3 goals during the Giants two finals games. Cameron ended his season with 46 goals.

2019–2020: Grand final appearance and Coleman Medal
Cameron had a tremendous 2019 AFL season, breaking all new career-highs for goals per game (3.3), kicks per game (11.7), marks per game (6.5), and disposals per game (16.2) along with recording a career-high 67 goals, 372 disposals, 150 marks, and 269 kicks. Cameron played the most home-and-away games he has played since 2016 (20), only missing two games. In the final round of the home-and away season, round 23, Cameron was behind in the Coleman Medal tally by 6 goals, sitting at 58 while leader Ben Brown was at 64, but Cameron was able to boot a career-high 9 goals against the Gold Coast Suns to end his season with 67 goals and capture his first Coleman Medal, also becoming the first-ever GWS player to win the award, Cameron was also selected into his second All-Australian Team as full-forward. Topping off a tremendous individual season for Cameron, the Giants made the finals for the fourth consecutive year, finishing 6th on the ladder. Cameron carried his strong form into finals, booting 2 goals in an elimination final victory over the Western Bulldogs and 3 goals the following week in a semi-final victory over the Brisbane Lions. Cameron continued to be a force for the Giants when he kicked another 3 goals against Collingwood in a preliminary final, helping GWS reach their first-ever Grand Final in club history. Cameron kicked the first (and his only) goal of the 2019 AFL Grand Final in a disappointing 89-point loss to Richmond.

During the 2020 season, it was revealed that Cameron was the most highly paid player in the AFL contracted with a back-ended deal for roughly $1.5 million for 2020 (which was later reduced to $1.1 million per year due to the COVID-19 pandemic).

Geelong (2021–present)
This came following the stresses on players from the 2020 hubs and lockdowns, with Cameron on record as saying “The hub hurt me in a lot of ways - it was tough to be locked down, I really hated sitting in a hotel. I got myself in that headspace where I really battled. I probably should’ve spoken to the club about it earlier.”. The Giants traded Cameron to Geelong on the final day of trade period in exchange for three first-round draft picks.

After an injury-interrupted 2021 AFL season, his first at Geelong, many regard Cameron's 2022 campaign as a career-best year. A lack of injury concerns allowed Cameron to utilise his mobility to play up the ground as a high half-forward flank type. His ability to roam through the midfield as a tall forward made him a dangerous and unique player. AFL champion David King remarked that in 2022, he was "clearly" the best player in the competition. He was awarded his third All-Australian selection in the 2022 All-Australian team, came equal third in the Coleman Medal, and received his first Carji Greeves Medal, his second ever best & fairest award. He won his first ever premiership, and polled a career-high 19 votes in the 2022 Brownlow Medal to come eighth.

Statistics
Updated to the end of the 2022 season.

|-
| 2012 ||  || 18
| 16 || 29 || 15 || 115 || 45 || 160 || 80 || 28 || 1.8 || 0.9 || 7.2 || 2.8 || 10.0 || 5.0 || 1.8 || 0
|-
| 2013 ||  || 18
| 21 || 62 || 27 || 170 || 54 || 224 || 160 || 27 || 3.0 || 1.3 || 8.1 || 2.6 || 10.7 || 5.0 || 1.3 || 6
|-
| 2014 ||  || 18
| 14 || 29 || 21 || 105 || 28 || 133 || 60 || 18 || 2.1 || 1.5 || 7.5 || 2.0 || 9.5 || 4.3 || 1.3 || 0
|-
| 2015 ||  || 18
| 22 || 63 || 37 || 185 || 50 || 235 || 122 || 37 || 2.7 || 1.7 || 8.5 || 2.3 || 10.5 || 5.3 || 1.8 || 12
|-
| 2016 ||  || 18
| 20 || 53 || 25 || 143 || 82 || 225 || 72 || 39 || 2.7 || 1.3 || 7.2 || 2.0 || 9.5 || 4.3 || 1.3 || 4
|-
| 2017 ||  || 18
| 19 || 45 || 25 || 207 || 94 || 301 || 134 || 39 || 2.4 || 1.3 || 10.9 || 4.9 || 15.8 || 7.1 || 2.1 || 5
|-
| 2018 ||  || 18
| 18 || 46 || 32 || 202 || 72 || 274 || 111 || 24 || 2.6 || 1.8 || 11.2 || 4.0 || 15.2 || 6.2 || 1.3 || 6
|-
| 2019 ||  || 18
| 24 || bgcolor=CAE1FF | 76† || bgcolor=CAE1FF | 50† || 280 || 105 || 385 || 157 || 33 || bgcolor=CAE1FF | 3.2† || bgcolor=CAE1FF | 2.1† || 11.7 || 4.4 || 16.0 || 6.5 || 1.4 || 13
|-
| 2020 ||  || 18
| 17 || 24 || 13 || 121 || 55 || 176 || 67 || 24 || 1.4 || 0.8 || 7.1 || 3.2 || 10.4 || 3.9 || 1.4 || 3
|-
| 2021 ||  || 5
| 15 || 39 || 16 || 118 || 57 || 175 || 57 || 16 || 2.6 || 1.1 || 7.9 || 3.8 || 11.7 || 3.8 || 1.7 || 6
|-
| scope=row bgcolor=F0E68C | 2022# ||  || 5
| 24 || 65 || 37 || 272 || 116 || 388 || 141 || 34 || 2.7 || 1.5 || 11.3 || 4.8 || 16.2 || 5.9 || 1.4 || 19
|- class=sortbottom
! colspan=3 | Career
! 210 !! 531 !! 298 !! 1918 !! 758 !! 2676 !! 1107 !! 319 !! 2.5 !! 1.4 !! 9.1 !! 3.6 !! 12.7 !! 5.3 !! 1.5 !! 74
|}

Notes

Personal life
Cameron grew up supporting Collingwood.

Honours and achievements
Team
 AFL premiership player: 2022
 McClelland Trophy: 2022

Individual
 3× All-Australian team: 2013, 2019, 2022
 Coleman Medal: 2019
 Kevin Sheedy Medal: 2013
 Carji Greeves Medal: 2022
 9× Greater Western Sydney leading goalkicker: 2012, 2013, 2014, 2015, 2016, 2017, 2018, 2019, 2020
 AFLPA best first year player: 2012
 AFLCA best young player of the year: 2013
 2× 22under22 team: 2013, 2015
 AFL Rising Star nominee: 2012

References

External links

 

1993 births
Living people
Greater Western Sydney Giants players
Greater Western Victoria Rebels players
Australian rules footballers from Victoria (Australia)
All-Australians (AFL)
Kevin Sheedy Medal winners
Coleman Medal winners
Geelong Football Club players
Geelong Football Club Premiership players
One-time VFL/AFL Premiership players
Carji Greeves Medal winners